Łącko  may refer to:

Łącko, Kuyavian-Pomeranian Voivodeship (north-central Poland)
Łącko, Lesser Poland Voivodeship (south Poland)
Łącko, Warmian-Masurian Voivodeship (north Poland)
Łącko, West Pomeranian Voivodeship (north-west Poland)

See also
Läckö